Abasia (from Greek: a-, without and basis, step) is the inability to walk owing to impairment in motor coordination.

The term covers a spectrum of medical disorders such as:
 choreic abasia: caused by chorea of the legs
 paralytic abasia: caused by paralysis of the leg muscles
 spastic abasia: caused by spastic stiffening of the leg muscles
 trembling abasia: caused by trembling of the legs

Abasia is frequently accompanied by astasis, an inability to stand, see Astasia-abasia.

See also
 Aboulia
 Astasia
 Paul Oscar Blocq

References

Further reading
 
 
 

Symptoms and signs: Nervous system